San Miguel, officially the Municipality of San Miguel,  is a 4th class municipality in the province of Iloilo, Philippines. According to the 2020 census, it has a population of 30,115 people.

The municipality is bordered by Cabatuan in the north, Santa Barbara and Pavia in the east, Alimodian and Leon in the west, and by Oton in the south. Southeast of San Miguel is Mandurriao district of Iloilo City.

It is the site of Aganan River Dam, which is an agricultural purpose dam used for irrigation of the ricefields in the surrounding towns. Pepsi Bottlers Philippines Inc. has a bottling plant in San Miguel, which supplies Pepsi products in Panay Island.

San Miguel is a part of the Metro Iloilo–Guimaras area, centered on Iloilo City.

Geography

Barangays
San Miguel is politically subdivided into 24 barangays.

Climate

Demographics

Economy

References

External links
 [ Philippine Standard Geographic Code]
 Philippine Census Information
 Local Governance Performance Management System

Municipalities of Iloilo